"United (We Love You)" was a single released by the English football team Manchester United in 1993. It reached number 37 in the UK Singles Chart.

References

1993 singles
Manchester United F.C. songs
Football songs and chants
1993 songs
Song articles with missing songwriters